Cross Lane is a settlement on the Isle of Wight, off the south coast of England.

The hamlet is a suburb of the county town of Newport, and is located on the A3054 road, to the north-east of the town.

Hamlets on the Isle of Wight